Patrick James Hoban (born 28 July 1991) is an Irish professional footballer who plays for Dundalk in the League of Ireland Premier Division, as a forward.

He had his greatest successes in two spells at Dundalk, where he scored over 100 goals in total. He finished as top scorer as they won the League of Ireland Premier Division in 2014 and 2018, and won another title in 2019.

Career

Early career
Born in Loughrea, County Galway, to an English mother, Hoban played both hurling and football as a youth. He represented his town at hurling and Mervue United in football, who he helped to win promotion from the A Championship to the League of Ireland with a 5–2 aggregate victory over Kildare County in the 2008 play-off final.

In July 2010, Hoban journeyed to England after being offered to train with Championship club Bristol City, managed by Steve Coppell and having just signed England international goalkeeper David James.  In November he signed a one-year contract, along fellow 19-year-old Irishman Jimmy Keohane. He scored regularly for the Robins' reserve team but did not break into the first team, being loaned to local non-league team Clevedon Town before being released.

Dundalk
Hoban returned to Mervue United and then moved to League of Ireland Premier Division side Dundalk in 2013. In his first season at Oriel Park, he scored 15 times as the Lilywhites came runners-up to St. Patrick's Athletic; this included a hat-trick on 12 July in a 3–0 home win over Bohemians.

He was top scorer with 20 goals as they won the 2014 title, their first for 19 years. On 24 July that year, he scored the winning goal in their 2–1 win away to Hajduk Split in the second leg of the second qualifying round of the UEFA Europa League, but they lost 3–2 on aggregate to the Croatians. The team also won the League of Ireland Cup with a 3–2 victory over Shamrock Rovers on 19 September, Hoban scoring their third goal to seal a first trophy in 12 years.

Oxford United
Hoban signed with English League Two side Oxford United in November 2014, having turned down the chance to play on trial at Scottish Premier League club Kilmarnock. The contract did not take effect until 1 January. He made his professional debut on 17 January 2015 in a 3–2 home loss to Southend United, replacing Cheyenne Dunkley at half time. Hoban totalled 20 appearances that season for the U's, mostly starting, but scored just once to open a 2–1 comeback win over Carlisle United at the Kassam Stadium on 28 March.

Having scored three times in 43 League appearances (26 of them as a substitute) he joined Stevenage in the same division on a month's loan on 1 February 2016. He played his one game for them on 6 February, starting in a 1–0 home to Crawley Town and having a good opportunity to score saved by Jamie Jones.

On 1 March 2016, Hoban joined National League side Grimsby Town on loan until the end of the season. He played in Grimsby's 3–1 victory over Forest Green Rovers in the 2016 National League play-off Final at Wembley Stadium, seeing the Mariners promoted to League Two after a six-year absence from the Football League. Hoban did not score in his 14 total appearances, and was not retained when his loan expired. He was released by Oxford at the end of the season.

Mansfield Town
Following his release from Oxford, Hoban stayed in League Two and joined Mansfield Town in June 2016. He made his debut on 6 August as they began the season with a 3–2 win at Newport County, playing the final six minutes in place of Matt Green, and on 1 October he scored his first goal for the Stags, opening a 1–1 draw at Crewe Alexandra by heading Kevan Hurst's cross.

On 10 January 2017, Hoban scored both goals in the final six minutes as Mansfield defeated Oldham Athletic in the third round of the EFL Trophy at Field Mill. He was released at the end of the 2016–17 season.

Return to Dundalk
On 24 November 2017 Hoban rejoined Dundalk. The following 11 February he played in the FAI President's Cup, a 4–2 home loss to Cork City, filling in for the last 23 minutes in place of Krisztián Adorján. On 19 July, in the Europa League first qualifying round second leg, he scored in a 2–1 (3–1 aggregate) win over Estonia's Levadia Tallinn.

Hoban was voted League of Ireland Premier Division Player of the Month in June 2018 after scoring five goals in four games that month, including three in a 4–0 home win over Limerick on 8 June. On 5 October, he scored a late equaliser in a 1–1 home draw with St Patrick's Athletic to win Dundalk's 13th league title. He finished the season as top scorer with 29 goals but left the last league game injured, causing concern over whether he would play the FAI Cup Final against Cork City.

On 9 February, Hoban scored as Dundalk defeated Cork 2–1 at Turners Cross to win the 2019 President of Ireland's Cup. He was sent off on 3 May in a 2–2 home draw with Derry City, after having scored twice. Dundalk retained their league title, and Hoban was the second highest scorer with 13 goals, one behind Junior Ogedi-Uzokwe of Derry. Dundalk also won the League Cup, with Hoban scoring four times in a 6–1 win over Bohemians in the semi-final on 19 August. Additionally, he scored the last goal of a 6–0 win (7–1 aggregate) over Northern Irish champions Linfield in the Champions Cup on 11 November. On 16 October 2019, Hoban signed a contract for two more seasons at Dundalk.

On 6 March 2020, Hoban scored twice in a 4–0 win at Finn Harps to reach 100 Irish top-flight goals, the 44th player to reach that landmark. His 100th goal in all competitions for Dundalk came on 31 July, in a 1–1 home draw with St Patrick's. In the 2020 Europa League third qualifying round, he scored in the penalty shoot-out against Sheriff Tiraspol helping Dundalk qualify for the playoffs. Dundalk went on to qualify for the 2020–21 UEFA Europa League group stage and he scored the opening goal but lost 4–3 against Rapid Vienna in the 2020–21 UEFA Europa League group stage. In the 2021–22 Europa Conference League 3rd round qualifiers He scored 1 goal against Vitesse Arnhem, but lost 2–1.

Career statistics

Honours
Dundalk
League of Ireland Premier Division: 2014, 2018, 2019
League of Ireland Cup: 2014, 2019
FAI Cup: 2018, 2020
 President's Cup: 2019, 2021
 Champions Cup: 2019	

Grimsby Town
National League play-offs: 2016

Individual
League of Ireland Premier Division top scorer: 2014, 2018, 2020
League of Ireland Premier Division Player of the Month: July 2013, October 2014, June 2018

References

External links

1991 births
Living people
Republic of Ireland association footballers
Association football forwards
Expatriate footballers in England
Mervue United A.F.C. players
Bristol City F.C. players
Clevedon Town F.C. players
Dundalk F.C. players
Oxford United F.C. players
Stevenage F.C. players
Grimsby Town F.C. players
Mansfield Town F.C. players
Southern Football League players
League of Ireland players
English Football League players
Association footballers from County Galway
A Championship players
Irish expatriate sportspeople in England
Irish people of English descent